The Musée Delta (English: Delta Museum), is a French aerospace museum, located at the south of Paris–Orly Airport, south of Paris, and in the commune of Athis-Mons. It was inaugurated in 1988.

Its main purpose is to present the aircraft which have made the history of the aeronautical technology of the Delta wing. It is the southern counterpart of the Musée de l'air et de l'espace located in Le Bourget.

Tarmac/Exterior Exhibit 

 Concorde
 Dassault Mercure
 Dassault Mirage III
 Sud Aviation Caravelle

See also 

 List of aerospace museums
 List of museums in Paris

References

External links 

  

Museums in Essonne
Aerospace museums in France
National museums of France
Museums established in 1988
1988 establishments in France
Air force museums